Shane McDermott (born February 18, 1992) is an American football center who is currently a free agent. He played college football at Miami.

College career
At Miami, McDermott played in 46 games starting in 36 during his college career. As a senior, he earned First-team All-Atlantic Coast Conference in 2014.

Professional career

Dallas Cowboys
McDermott was signed by the Cowboys as an undrafted free agent on May 8, 2015. He was released by the Cowboys on September 5, 2015 during final roster cuts.

Carolina Panthers
On September 9, 2015, McDermott was signed to the Panthers' practice squad but was released the following week.

New York Giants
On November 18, 2015, McDermott was signed to the Giants' practice squad. He signed a reserve/future contract on January 1, 2016 and was released by the Giants on August 30, 2016 and was signed to the practice squad. He was released on September 21, 2016.

Dallas Cowboys (second stint)
On September 22, 2016, McDermott was signed to the Cowboys' practice squad and was released on October 11, 2016.

New York Giants (second stint)
On November 17, 2016, McDermott was signed to the Giants practice squad and was promoted to the active roster two days later. He was released by the Giants on December 3, 2016.

References

External links
New York Giants bio
Miami Hurricanes bio

1992 births
Living people
Players of American football from Florida
American football centers
People from Lake Worth Beach, Florida
Miami Hurricanes football players
Dallas Cowboys players
Carolina Panthers players
New York Giants players